Jeon Sang-hoon (born 10 September 1989) is a South Korean footballer who plays as full-back for Daejeon Citizen in K League 2.

Career
Jeon Sang-hoon was selected by Daejeon Citizen in 2011 K League draft.

References

External links 

1989 births
Living people
Association football fullbacks
South Korean footballers
Daejeon Hana Citizen FC players
Ansan Mugunghwa FC players
Gyeongnam FC players
K League 1 players
K League 2 players